Napaktulik Lake formerly Takiyuak Lake or Takijuq Lake is the eighth largest lake in Nunavut, Canada.

See also
List of lakes of Nunavut
List of lakes of Canada

References

Lakes of Kitikmeot Region